Diego Hurtado de Mendoza may refer to:

Diego Hurtado de Mendoza (Admiral of Castile) (1367–1404), Admiral of Castile and tenth head of the House of Mendoza
Diego Hurtado de Mendoza, 1st Duke of the Infantado (1417–1479), Spanish noble
Diego Hurtado de Mendoza y Quiñones (1444–1502), cardinal
Diego Hurtado de Mendoza, 3rd Duke of the Infantado (1461–1531), Spanish noble
Diego Hurtado de Mendoza, 1st Count of Melito (1469–1536), military commander in Italian Wars & Revolt of the Brotherhoods; Viceroy of Valencia
Diego Hurtado de Mendoza, 2nd Marquis of Cañete (1478–1542), Spanish nobleman and military leader
Diego Hurtado de Mendoza (director), Cuban director
Diego Hurtado de Mendoza (explorer) (fl. 1500-1530s), Spanish navigator and explorer, nephew of Hernán Cortés (see the history of the city of Santo Domingo Tehuantepec in Mexico)
Diego Hurtado de Mendoza, 4th Count of Saldaña (1515-1566), son of Íñigo López de Mendoza, 4th Duke of the Infantado
Diego Hurtado de Mendoza, 4th Marquis of Cañete, Spanish nobleman
Diego Hurtado de Mendoza (poet and diplomat) (1503–1575), Spanish poet, novelist, historian, and diplomat
Diego Hurtado de Mendoza y de la Cerda (1489-1578), prince of Mélito; Viceroy of Catalonia, Viceroy & Lieutenant of Aragon